Michael Joseph Garcia (born April 24, 1976) is an American politician and former United States Navy pilot serving as the U.S. representative for California's 27th congressional district. A Republican, he was first elected in a May 2020 special election and went on to win a full term in the general election.

Garcia was born in Granada Hills, California, and educated at Saugus High School, the United States Naval Academy, and Georgetown University. He served in the U.S. Navy from 1998 to 2012, participating in multiple combat missions during the Iraq War. Following his active duty in the Navy he worked at Raytheon Intelligence & Space.

Garcia has faced and defeated Democratic nominee Christy Smith in all three of his successful elections: the 2020 special election held to fill the vacancy caused by Representative Katie Hill's resignation; the 2020 general election, when he won his first full term; and the 2022 general election, when he won his second term. Due to redistricting, Garcia represents the new 27th district in the 118th United States Congress.

Early life and education
Mike Garcia was born on April 24, 1976, in Granada Hills, California, a suburb of Los Angeles, to parents who had immigrated from Mexico in 1959. In 1994, he graduated from Saugus High School and earned a Bachelor of Science in political science, graduating in the top 3% of his class, from the United States Naval Academy after being nominated by Representative Buck McKeon. In 1998, he earned a Master of Arts in national security policy studies from Georgetown University.

Military and civilian career
Garcia joined the United States Navy in May 1998, and was sent to flight school at Naval Air Station Pensacola. He was deployed as an F/A-18 aviator from the USS Nimitz. During the 2003 invasion of Iraq, he participated in over 30 combat missions.

From 2009 to 2018, Garcia worked as a business development manager at Raytheon Intelligence & Space, one of four business segments of Raytheon Technologies.

U.S. House of Representatives

Elections

2020 special 

In the 2018 election in California's 25th congressional district, Democrat Katie Hill defeated incumbent Representative Steve Knight. In April 2019, Garcia announced that he would challenge Hill in the 2020 election. On November 3, 2019, Hill resigned from Congress due to a scandal involving her relationship with a campaign staffer. Governor Gavin Newsom ordered a special election to fill the vacancy caused by Hill's resignation.

Garcia placed second in the nonpartisan blanket primary on March 3, 2020, ahead of former Representative Steve Knight and behind Christy Smith, a member of the California State Assembly. Garcia was endorsed by the Club for Growth and the Susan B. Anthony List.

Garcia campaigned on strengthening the United States military and cutting taxes to improve the economy, specifically in response to the COVID-19 pandemic. He also campaigned against the Democratic leadership in the California state government. His platform included promises to "defeat socialism" and "build the wall." Garcia said he was in favor of "securing and better surveillance of our borders."

On May 12, 2020, Garcia defeated Smith in the special election in an upset. She officially conceded the race the next day, but affirmed her intention to run against Garcia in the November general election for a full term in Congress. Garcia's victory marked the first time since 1998 that a Republican flipped a California congressional district held by a Democrat; in 1998, Doug Ose won in the 3rd congressional district. He is also the first Hispanic Republican representative to serve from California since Romualdo Pacheco left office in 1883, after representing the 4th congressional district.

2020 general 

In the November general election, Garcia faced Smith in a rematch. In August, Garcia was listed as one of the 10 most vulnerable House members by Roll Call. Votes were still being counted a week after the election, though Smith held a lead. Smith conceded to Garcia on November 30, 2020. Garcia raised $3 million more than Smith. Garcia won by only 333 votes.

2022 

Garcia ran for reelection in what is now California's 27th congressional district. He defeated Christy Smith again in the November 8, 2022, general election. Garcia's win resulted in the Republican Party winning its 218th seat in the 2022 United States House of Representatives elections, giving Republicans the House majority in the 118th United States Congress.

Tenure
Garcia was sworn into office on May 19, 2020. In January 2021, he voted to object to Congress's certification of the states' Electoral College votes.

Committee assignments
 Committee on Appropriations
 Committee on Science, Space, and Technology
 Committee on Intelligence

Caucus memberships 

 Republican Study Committee

Political positions

Certification of the 2020 election 
On January 4, 2021, Garcia announced his intention to reject some states' electoral votes based on unsubstantiated claims of fraud. On January 6, he objected to Congress's certification of the states' Electoral College votes. He later acknowledged Joe Biden's win and said the "election process has run its course".

Abortion
According to California Catholic Daily, Garcia opposes abortion and does not support federal funding of Planned Parenthood. After winning the special election, he signed a petition to bring the Born-Alive Abortion Survivors Protection Act to the House floor for a vote. Garcia has cosponsored proposed legislation that would virtually ban abortion and some forms of birth control.

COVID-19 pandemic
During a virtual debate with Smith before the special election, Garcia said that financial aid to small businesses should be administered through cities and local chambers of commerce.

Garcia has called on the United States House Select Subcommittee on the Coronavirus Crisis to investigate Governor Gavin Newsom's policy on nursing homes during the pandemic. Along with other Republican representatives, Garcia claimed that Newsom had ignored guidance provided by the Centers for Medicare & Medicaid Services.

Garcia voted against the American Rescue Plan Act of 2021.

Defense
According to Garcia's campaign website, he supports passing a $750 billion budget for the United States Department of Defense.

Impeachment of Donald Trump
Garcia voted against impeachment in Donald Trump's second impeachment after the 2021 attack on the United States Capitol.

Guns
Garcia has an A rating from the Gun Owners of America. He voted against the Bipartisan Safer Communities Act.

Health care
Garcia has advocated for repealing the Patient Protection and Affordable Care Act. During his campaign, he said he "was not a big fan of Medicaid."

Immigration
Garcia supports the construction of a wall along the Mexico–United States border. He is in favor of increasing surveillance at the border. Garcia has voiced opposition against legalizing the DREAM Act.

Iraq
In June 2021, Garcia was one of 49 House Republicans to vote to repeal the AUMF against Iraq.

LGBT rights
In 2021, Garcia voted against the Equality Act, calling it "contrary to American ideals".

On July 19, 2022, Garcia and 46 other Republican U.S. representatives voted for the Respect for Marriage Act, which would codify the right to same-sex marriage in federal law.

Term limits
Garcia supports congressional term limits.

Tax policy
In January 2021, Garcia introduced the State and Local Tax (SALT) Fairness Act, a bill to eliminate the SALT deduction cap created in the Tax Cuts and Jobs Act of 2017. Compared to residents of other states, Californians are disproportionately impacted by the SALT deduction cap.

Antitrust bill
In 2022, Garcia was one of 39 Republicans to vote for the Merger Filing Fee Modernization Act of 2022, an antitrust package that would crack down on corporations for anti-competitive behavior.

Personal life
Garcia's wife Rebecca is an interior designer. They have two sons. Garcia and his family live in Santa Clarita, California.

Electoral history

See also
List of Hispanic and Latino Americans in the United States Congress

References

External links

 
Congressman Mike Garcia official U.S. House website
 Campaign website
 
 

|-

|-

1976 births
21st-century American politicians
American Christians
American politicians of Mexican descent
American Protestants
United States Navy personnel of the Iraq War
Businesspeople in aviation
Christians from California
Georgetown University alumni
Hispanic and Latino American members of the United States Congress
Living people
Military personnel from California
People from Santa Clarita, California
Protestants from California
Raytheon Technologies people
Republican Party members of the United States House of Representatives from California
United States Naval Academy alumni
United States Naval Aviators
United States Navy officers
Latino conservatism in the United States